TVBS Entertainment Channel (formerly TVBS-G) is a satellite television channel in Taiwan, launched on 12 September 1994.

TVBS Entertainment Channel rebroadcasts Hong Kong dramas from TVB, yet also produces its own dramas since 2003.

Programs

Dramas

See also 
 Television Broadcasts Limited

External links 
  TVBS Entertainment Channel Official Website

Television stations in Taiwan
Television channels and stations established in 1994
Companies of Taiwan
TVB